The United States Department of Agriculture defines the T Value as the maximum average soil loss (in tons per year) that will still allow economical maintenance of the current level of production into the future.

References

United States Department of Agriculture